Headspace are an English progressive metal band formed in 2006 by keyboardist Adam Wakeman with former Threshold singer Damian Wilson. Wakeman is also keyboardist in Ozzy Osbourne's band.

Their first release, an EP entitled I Am... coincided with their support shows with Osbourne on the European Leg of the Black Rain tour in 2007.  Their debut concept album I Am Anonymous was released worldwide on 22 May 2012 on the Inside Out / Century Media label.

In November 2015, they announced a follow-up album, All That You Fear is Gone, which was released on 26 February 2016. It was their first release with drummer Adam Falkner. In January 2016, they released a song from the album: "Your Life Will Change".

Members 
 Damian Wilson - lead vocals (2006–present)
 Pete Rinaldi - guitars (2006–present)
 Lee Pomeroy - bass (2006–present)
 Adam Wakeman - keyboards (2006–present)
 Adam Falkner - drums (2015–present)

former members
 Richard Brook - drums (2006–2015)

Discography 
 I Am... (EP, 2007)
 I Am Anonymous (2012)
 All That You Fear is Gone (2016)

References

External links

 Official website

English progressive rock groups
Musical groups established in 2006
English progressive metal musical groups
Heavy metal supergroups
Century Media Records artists
2006 establishments in England